The first series of Renminbi banknotes was introduced during the Chinese Civil War by the newly founded People's Bank of China on December 1, 1948, nearly one year before the founding of the People's Republic of China itself. It was issued to unify and replace the various currencies of the communist-held territories as well as the currency of the Nationalist government.

This series also called "Old Currency", which 10,000 yuan is equal to 1 yuan of the 2nd series and later (called "New Currency").

Due to the turbulent political situation at the time, the first series is rather chaotic, with many versions issued for each denomination. The banknotes show a mixture of agricultural and industrial scenes, modes of transportation, and famous sites.

The notes were issued in 12 denominations: ¥1, ¥5, ¥10, ¥20, ¥50, ¥100, ¥200, ¥500, ¥1,000, ¥5,000, ¥10,000 and ¥50,000, with a total of 62 designs. They were officially withdrawn on various dates between April 1, 1955, and May 10, 1955.

Some of these notes have words "Republic of China"  on them to show the issuance year in the Republic of China Era. Though the PRC adopted the Common Era to replace the ROC Era in 1949 and have been avoiding using "Republic of China" in any possible circumstance, these notes were issued and used until 1955, when a revaluation of Reminbi took place.

List

¥1

¥5

¥10

¥20

¥50

¥100

¥200

¥500

¥1,000

¥5,000

¥10,000

¥50,000

References

Banknotes of China
Currencies introduced in 1948
Renminbi
Chinese numismatics